Asbjørn Tenden (born 9 April 1975) is a Norwegian footballer.

From 1995 to 1996 he played 10 games in the Norwegian Premier League for SK Brann. In that period he scored one goal in the game against Ham-Kam at Brann Stadion on 27 August 1995 when he came on a substitute for Frank Strandli in the 89th minute.

In the 1996 season he only played one league game as a substitute and left the club after the season. Before he left the club after the season he also got five minutes as a substitute in a game in the UEFA Cup Winners' Cup against PSV Eindhoven.

In IK Start he played 33 games and scored seven goals in the Norwegian Premier League.

Later he has played for local clubs such as Førde and later Loen IL on the lower levels of the Norwegian league system. He is the brother of footballer Steinar Tenden.

References

External links 
 

1975 births
Living people
Norwegian footballers
Stryn TIL players
SK Brann players
IK Start players
Eliteserien players
Association football forwards
People from Stryn
Sportspeople from Vestland